Bagh e Feiz or Bāgh-e Feiz is a posh neighbourhood located  West of Tehran, the capital city of Iran.
Kourosh Mall or Kourosh Complex, which is one of the biggest shopping centres and movie theatres in Tehran, is located in this neighbourhood.

References 

Neighbourhoods in Tehran